Vertigo pusilla is a species of minute air-breathing land snail, a terrestrial pulmonate gastropod mollusk or micromollusk in the family Vertiginidae, the whorl snails. 

Vertigo pusilla is the type species of the genus Vertigo.

Subspecies
 † Vertigo pusilla irenae Schlickum, 1975 
 Vertigo pusilla pusilla O. F. Müller, 1774
 † Vertigo pusilla sarmatica Kókay, 2006

Shell description 
1,66 to 2,18 mm high and 1,01 to 1,20 mm wide
Shell subfusiform, with, somewhat of a quadrangular outline, thin and semitransparent, very glossy, horn-color, with a faint tinge of yellow, very slightly and remotely striate in the line of growth; periphery rounded, with a tendency to angularity; epidermis thin; whorls 4 ½ or 5, very convex and cylindrical, gradually increasing in size, the penultimate whorl as broad as the last, which occupies about two-fifths of the shell. Spire is shortish, but rather tapering, and blunt at the point. Suture is very deep.

Aperture is semioval, contracted or sinuous in the middle of the outer edge; teeth six or seven, viz. two on the pillar [parietal wall], two on the pillar lip (the inner one of which is always larger, and the outside one tubercular and placed in the angle where the outer lip joins), and two or three within the outer lip (the third, when it is present, placed near the pillar lip and being a mere tubercle:) outer lip rather thick and slightly reflected, strengthened by a strong rib both outside and inside, which is situate near the opening of the mouth and is yellowish-white; outer edge rather abruptly inflected; inner lip slightly thickened in full grown specimens; umbilicus small and narrow, contracted by a rather sharp and gibbous crest or ridge at the base of the shell.

Distribution 

This snail occurs in European countries and islands including:
 Czech Republic
 Netherlands
 Poland
 Slovakia
 Ukraine
 Great Britain
 Ireland

References
This article incorporates public domain text from reference.

 Westerlund, C. A. (1867). Beschreibungen und Kritik neuer Mollusken. Malakozoologische Blätter. 14: 199-206.
 Provoost, S.; Bonte, D. (Ed.) (2004). Animated dunes: a view of biodiversity at the Flemish coast [Levende duinen: een overzicht van de biodiversiteit aan de Vlaamse kust]. Mededelingen van het Instituut voor Natuurbehoud, 22. Instituut voor Natuurbehoud: Brussel, Belgium. ISBN 90-403-0205-7. 416, ill., appendices pp
 Sysoev, A. V. & Schileyko, A. A. (2009). Land snails and slugs of Russia and adjacent countries. Sofia/Moskva (Pensoft). 312 pp., 142 plates

External links
Vertigo pusilla at Animalbase taxonomy,short description, distribution, biology,status (threats), images
 Müller, O. F. (1774). Vermium terrestrium et fluviatilium, seu animalium infusorium, Helminthicorum, et testaceorum, non marinorum, succincta historia. vol 2: I-XXXVI, 1-214, 10 unnumbered pages. Havniae et Lipsiae, apud Heineck et Faber, ex officina Molleriana
 Gmelin, J. F. (1791). Vermes. In: Gmelin J.F. (Ed.) Caroli a Linnaei Systema Naturae per Regna Tria Naturae, Ed. 13. Tome 1(6). G.E. Beer, Lipsiae 
 Schileyko, A. A. & Rymzhanov, T. S. (2013). Fauna of land mollusks (Gastropoda, Pulmonata Terrestria) of Kazakhstan and adjacent territories. Moscow-Almaty: KMK Scientific Press. 389 pp

pusilla
Gastropods described in 1774
Taxa named by Otto Friedrich Müller
Taxobox binomials not recognized by IUCN